Duchess Elsa of Württemberg (Elsa Mathilde Marie; 1 March 1876 – 27 May 1936) was a daughter of Duke Eugen of Württemberg and Grand Duchess Vera Constantinovna of Russia. She married Prince Albert of Schaumburg-Lippe.

Early life and family
Duchess Elsa was born at Stuttgart, Kingdom of Württemberg, the elder twin daughter of Duke Eugen of Württemberg (1846–1877) (son of Duke Eugen of Württemberg and Princess Mathilde of Schaumburg-Lippe) and his wife, Grand Duchess Vera Constantinovna of Russia (1854–1912) (daughter of Grand Duke Konstantin Nikolayevich of Russia and Princess Alexandra of Saxe-Altenburg). Her younger twin sister was Duchess Olga of Württemberg (1876–1932).

Failed engagement
On January 28, 1895, the British Court Circular published the following: "We are informed that a marriage has been arranged between His Royal Highness Prince Alfred of Saxe-Coburg and Gotha, only son of their Royal Highnesses the Duke and Duchess of Saxe-Coburg and Gotha and grandson of her Majesty, and Her Royal Highness the Duchess Elsa Matilda Marie, elder twin daughter of the late Duke William Eugene of Württemberg by his marriage with his cousin the Grand Duchess Vera of Russia."  The marriage did not take place.

Marriage and issue 
On 6 May 1897, in Stuttgart, she married Prince Albert of Schaumburg-Lippe (1869–1942), son of Prince William of Schaumburg-Lippe and Princess Bathildis of Anhalt-Dessau.
They had four children:
Prince Max of Schaumburg-Lippe (28 March 1898 – 4 February 1974), married in 1933 to Helga Lee Roderbourg, no issue;
Prince Franz Josef of Schaumburg-Lippe (1 September 1899 – 7 July 1963), married in 1959 to Maria Theresia Peschel, no issue;
Prince Alexander of Schaumburg-Lippe (20 January 1901  – 26 November 1923);
Princess Bathildis of Schaumburg-Lippe (11 November 1903 – 29 June 1983), married in 1925 to Wolrad, Prince of Schaumburg-Lippe, had issue.

Ancestry

Notes and sources
thePeerage.com - Elsa Herzogin von Württemberg
The Royal House of Stuart, London, 1969, 1971, 1976, Addington, A. C., Reference: 223

1876 births
1936 deaths
Duchesses of Württemberg
House of Lippe
Nobility from Stuttgart
Princesses of Schaumburg-Lippe
German twins